The Inglewood Advertiser was a newspaper published in Inglewood, Victoria, Australia.

Digitisation
The newspaper has been digitised by Trove for the editions between 6 January 1914 to 31 December 1918.

External links
 

Defunct newspapers published in Victoria (Australia)